FD or similar may refer to:

Science and technology
Canon FD lens mount, a standard for connecting a lens to a camera
Familial dysautonomia, a disorder of the autonomic nervous system 
Fermi–Dirac statistics (F–D statistics), in quantum statistics
Ferredoxin, iron–sulfur proteins 
File descriptor, in Unix and related computer operating systems
Freedesktop.org (fd.o), an interoperability project
Functional dependency, a constraint in a relation from a database
Nissan FD engine, for trucks and buses

Transportation
Thai AirAsia, IATA airline code FD
Mazda RX-7 (FD), a car
FD Phantom, original name for the FH Phantom jet fighter
Russian locomotive class FD
Flight director (aeronautics), a flight instrument 
Flying Dutchman (dinghy)

Other uses
Fidei defensor (Latin, 'Defender of the Faith'), part of the full style of many English/British monarchs
Fixed deposit, a financial instrument 
Finance Director, or chief financial officer, in a company
Fire Department, providing firefighting services
Force of the Right (Forța Dreptei), a Romanian political party

See also

 Floppy disk drive (FDD) in early computers